A Sister to Assist 'Er is a 1948 British  comedy film directed by George Dewhurst and starring Muriel Aked, Muriel George and Michael Howard. It was based on the popular play A Sister to Assist 'Er by John le Breton.

Cast
 Muriel Aked ...  Daisy Crawley 
 Muriel George ...  Gladys May 
 Michael Howard ...  Alf 
 Gene Ashley
 Ann Ripley

References

External links

1948 films
British comedy films
Films directed by George Dewhurst
British films based on plays
British black-and-white films
1948 comedy films
1940s English-language films
1940s British films